Vaishali Assembly constituency is an assembly constituency in Vaishali district in the Indian state of Bihar.

Overview
As per Delimitation of Parliamentary and Assembly constituencies Order, 2008, No. 125 Vaishali Assembly constituency is composed of the following: Vaishali, Paterhi Belsar and Goraul community development blocks.

Vaishali Assembly constituency is part of No. 16 Vaishali (Lok Sabha constituency).

Members of Vidhan Sabha

Election results

2020

1977-2015
In the 2015 state assembly elections, Raj Kishore Singh of JD(U) won the Vaishali seat defeating his nearest rival Brishin Patel of HAM. Contests in most years were multi cornered but only winners and runners up are being mentioned.  in past, Brishin Patel of JD(U) defeated Veena Shahi of Congress in October 2005 and February 2005. Veena Shahi of Congress defeated Brishin Patel of RJD in 2000.  Raj Kishore Sinha of JD defeated Veena Shahi of Congress in 1995.  Brishin Patel of JD defeated Hemant Kumar Shahi of Congress in 1990. Brishin Patel of LD defeated Rajendra Prasad Singh of Congress in 1985. Brishin Patel of Janata Party (Secular – Charan Singh) defeated Yogendra Prasad Singh, Independent, in 1980. Nagendra Prasad Singh of Janata Party defeated Laliteshwar Prasad Shahi of Congress  in 1977.

References

External links
 

Assembly constituencies of Bihar
Politics of Vaishali district